This is a list of past and present faculty members at the University of New Mexico.

References

University of New Mexico faculty